The 1958 LPGA Championship was the fourth LPGA Championship, held June 5–8 at Churchill Valley Country Club in Blackridge, Pennsylvania, a suburb east of Pittsburgh.

Mickey Wright, age 23, won the first of her four LPGA Championships, six strokes ahead of runner-up Fay Crocker. It was the first of Wright's thirteen major titles. Defending champion Louise Suggs finished ten strokes back, in a tie for ninth. The field consisted of 27 professionals; a concurrent event for amateurs was also held.

The LPGA Championship was played for a second straight year at Churchill Valley, which hosted its third major the following year, the U.S. Women's Open in 1959. The club closed in 2013.

Past champions in the field

Source:

Final leaderboard
Sunday, June 8, 1958

Source:

References

Women's PGA Championship
Golf in Pittsburgh
LPGA Championship
LPGA Championship
LPGA Championship
LPGA Championship
Women's sports in Pennsylvania